Winter X Games XIX (re-titled Winter X Games Aspen '15; styled as Winter X Games Nineteen in the official logo) were held from January 21 to January 25, 2015, in Aspen, Colorado. They were the 14th consecutive Winter X Games to be held in Aspen. The events were broadcast on ESPN. The games featured participants from the United States, Canada, Norway, Sweden, Japan, New Zealand, France, Switzerland, Italy, and Australia.

Participating athletes competed in six Skiing events, eight Snowboarding events, and five Snowmobiling events. There was also a Counter-Strike: Global Offensive exhibition tournament organized by Major League Gaming. The United States won 31 of 57 medals awarded, with nine other countries medalling.

Chronology of events

Day One
The games began on Wednesday, January 21 with the first event, the Women's Ski Superpipe. American Maddie Bowman came in first place with a score of 85.66. Japanese skier Ayana Onozuka placed second and American skier Brita Sigourney placed third.

Day Two
The second day began with three qualifying events, the Men's Snowboarder X Qualifying, Women's Snowboarder X Qualifying, and the Snowboarder X Adaptive Qualifying.
 
The afternoon consisted of the Mono Skier X Final. In the Mono Skier Final, American Chris Devlin-Young came in first place and Brandon Adam came in second.
 
In the evening, the Men's Snowboard SuperPipe Final, Snowmobile Speed & Style Final, and the Men's Snowboard SuperPipe Final were held. American Colten Moore won the Snowmobile Speed & Style Final, with Joe Parsons placing second and Cory Davis placing third. In the Snowboard SuperPipe Final, American snowboarder Danny Davis placed first, Japanese snowboarder Taku Hiraoka placed second, and Russian Iouri Podladtchikov placed third.

Day Three
The third day began with the Men's and Women's Snowboarder X Quarterfinal, Semifinal, and Final. In the men's final, Canadian Kevin Hill came in first place followed by Italian Omar Visintin and American Nate Holland. In the women's final, American Lindsey Jacobellis came in first place, with Canadian Dominique Maltais placing second and French Nelly Moenne Loccoz placing third.
 
The afternoon consisted of the Snowboarder X Adaptive semi finals and finals. American Keith Gabel came in first place, with New Zealand Carl Murphy coming in second and Canadian Alex Massie coming in third.
 
The evening consisted of the Snowboard Big Air final. Canadian Mark McMorris placed first, followed by Canadian Maxence Parrot and Japanese Yuki Kadono. The day ended with the Snowmobile Long Jump. American Heath Frisby won the event. Cory Davis came in second and Colten Moore came in third place.

Day Four
The fourth day began with the Men's Ski Slopestyle final in the morning, followed by the Women's Ski Slopestyle final in the afternoon. In the men's final, Nick Goepper came in first, Joss Christensen came in second, and Alex Bellemare came in third place. In the women's final, Swedish Emma Dahlström placed first. American Keri Herman came in second place followed by Canadian Dara Howell in third place.

Also in the afternoon was the Snowmobile Hillcross Quarterfinal, Semifinal, and Final. American Ryan Simon came in first place, followed by American Justin Thomas in second and Justin Titus in third.

The evening events consisted of the Women's Snowboard SuperPipe final and the Ski Big Air final. In the Women's SuperPipe final, fourteen-year-old American snowboarder Chloe Kim came in first place, making her the youngest person to ever win gold at the Winter X Games. American Kelly Clark took second place and Australian Torah Bright took third place.

In the Ski Big Air final, Canadian Vincent Gagnier came in first place, followed by American Bobby Brown in second and Swiss Elias Ambühl in third place.

Day Five
The fifth day was the final day of events for the 2015 Winter X Games, starting off with the Women's Snowboard Slopestyle Final in the morning. Norwegian Silje Norendal came in first place, with American Jamie Anderson coming in second and New Zealand Christy Prior coming in third place. American skier Nick Goepper won the Slopestyle final, with American Joss Christensen placing second.

At midday was the Snowmobile SnoCross Adaptive Final. American Garrett Goodwin placed first, followed by American Doug Henry in second and American Jim Wazny in third place.

The final event of the games was the Men's Ski SuperPipe Final. Canadian Simon d'Artois came in first place, French Kevin Rolland came in second place, and American Alex Ferreira came in third place.

Results

Medal count

Skiing

Women's SuperPipe results

Men's SuperPipe results

Men's Big Air results

Men's SlopeStyle results

Women's SlopeStyle results

Men's Mono Skier X results

Snowboarding

Men's Snowboarder X results

Women's Snowboarder X results

Men's Snowboard X Adaptive results

Men's Big Air results

Men's Slopestyle results

Women's Slopestyle results

Women's SuperPipe results

Men's SuperPipe results

Snowmobiling

Speed & Style results

Long Jump results

SnoCross Adaptive results

SnoCross results

HillCross results

References

External links
  Winter X Games XIX Page

Winter X Games
2015 in multi-sport events
2015 in American sports
Sports in Colorado
Pitkin County, Colorado
2015 in sports in Colorado
2015 in snowboarding
2015 in alpine skiing
Winter multi-sport events in the United States
International sports competitions hosted by the United States
January 2015 sports events in the United States